Synchronized swimming competitions at the 2012 Summer Olympics in London were held from Sunday 5 August to Friday 10 August, at the London Aquatics Centre. Two medal events were included in the programme — women's duet and women's team — with 100 athletes participating.

Qualifying system

For the team event, the 5 continental champions and 3 further non-qualified teams from an Olympic Qualifying Tournament qualified for the 2012 Summer Olympics. For the duet event, the same teams qualified, plus a further 16 non-qualified teams from the Olympic Qualifying Tournament qualified. The host nation is considered European champion, whilst the best-placed teams from Asia, Africa & Oceania at the 2011 World Aquatics Championships were to be considered as the respective continental champions.

Competition schedule

Medalists

Medal table

References

External links 

 
 
 

 
2012 Summer Olympics events
2012
2012 in synchronized swimming
Synchronised swimming competitions in the United Kingdom
International aquatics competitions hosted by the United Kingdom